Marvin Harvey "Bud" Ward (May 1, 1913 – January 2, 1968) was an American golfer best known for twice winning the U.S. Amateur, in 1939 and 1941.

Ward was born in Elma, Washington. He excelled as an amateur golfer, winning the U.S. Amateur twice, the Western Amateur three times and his home state Washington Amateur twice. He played on the Walker Cup team in 1938 and 1947. His best performance in a major came in 1939 U.S. Open when he finished one shot out of a playoff with Byron Nelson, Craig Wood, and Denny Shute.

Ward turned professional in 1949 and worked as a club pro until his death in 1968 from cancer. He died in San Mateo, California.

Ward was elected to the Pacific Northwest Golf Association Hall of Fame in 1979, the Pacific Northwest section of the PGA of America Hall of Fame in 1981, and the State of Washington Sports Hall of Fame.

Amateur wins
this list may be incomplete

1938 Washington Amateur
1939 U.S. Amateur
1940 Western Amateur
1941 U.S. Amateur, Western Amateur, Pacific Northwest Amateur
1942 Tam O'Shanter All American Amateur
1946 Washington Amateur
1947 Western Amateur

Professional wins
this list may be incomplete

1938 Washington Open (as an amateur)
1939 Northwest Open (as an amateur)
1940 Northwest Open (as an amateur)
1946 Northwest Open (as an amateur)
1947 Northwest Open (as an amateur)
1948 Northwest Open (as an amateur)
1949 Montana Open (as an amateur), Washington Open (as an amateur)
1951 Northern California Open
1952 Utah Open
1955 Washington Open, Northern California PGA Championship
1956 Northern California Open
1958 Northern California PGA Championship
1961 Northwest Open

Major championships

Amateur wins (2)

Results timeline
Amateur

Professional

Note: Ward never played in The Open Championship or the PGA Championship.

LA = low amateur
NT = no tournament
WD = withdrew
CUT = missed the half-way cut
"T" indicates a tie for a place
R256, R128, R64, R32, R16, QF, SF = round in which player lost in match play

Source for U.S. Open and U.S. Amateur: USGA Championship Database

Source for 1938 Amateur Championship: The Glasgow Herald, May 25, 1938, pg. 21.

Source for 1947 Amateur Championship: The Glasgow Herald, May 31, 1947, pg. 5.

U.S. national team appearances
Amateur
Walker Cup: 1938, 1947 (winners)

References

American male golfers
Golfers from Washington (state)
People from Elma, Washington
Deaths from cancer in California
1913 births
1968 deaths